Detective Daniel "Danny" Messer is a fictional character on the CBS crime drama series CSI: NY, portrayed by actor Carmine Giovinazzo.

Background
It has been implied that Danny grew up on Staten Island, New York (like the actor), in a family of law enforcers and law breakers (as is suggested in the episode "Tanglewood") of Italian origin. As a result, he formed his own set of hybrid ethics, seeking justice where it can be found. His badge number is "9104".

Though very little is known about the Messer family, Danny openly admits that he has had a rocky relationship with his older brother, Louie. Despite the strained relationship, Danny would come to lend money to Louie on more than one occasion (episode 211, "Trapped"). It is later learned that the brothers' relationship was permanently scarred by the events of a single night in 1991. After promising to take Danny to Atlantic City with some of his friends, the group stopped off at Giants stadium where Louie and two others began to severely beat a drug dealer, telling him it was an initiation into the Tanglewood Boys gang. When Danny protested, Louie called him a disgrace and told him to leave. It was later revealed that Louie deliberately sent Danny away to prevent any involvement in the subsequent murder of that drug dealer (episode 220, "Run Silent, Run Deep"). Due to Danny's DNA appearing on an old cigarette butt at the crime scene, Mac is forced to temporarily revoke Danny's badge until Danny is proven innocent.  Though hurt, Danny understood why and obliges without complaint. The cold case is eventually solved, but Louie is beaten into a coma by the remaining members of the Tanglewood Boys.  Danny is shown explaining that he finally understands Louie's actions. Later, Danny tearfully admits his grief and remorse to Mac.

Although Danny and his older brother grew apart in their teenage years, it can be said that they were close as children, since Danny fondly recalls rowing in "the bay" with his brother in their grandfather's boat to dive for bottles (episode 402, "The Deep"). He goes on to say that on one occasion their boat drifted into the harbor, and they were taken home by the Coast Guard, much to the dismay of their mother who, in turn, didn't speak much to her youngest son for a week thereafter; he describes it as "the quietest week ever."

After breaking his wrist in a fight as a young man, Danny left his growing baseball career, and entered the NYPD Police Academy, graduating first in his class (episode 122, "The Closer").  Despite this, because of his volatile personality, and possibly his history on the sidelines of the Tanglewood Boys gang, he was considered a bad fit for the CSI lab, and Lab Supervisor Mac Taylor was strongly cautioned not to hire him.  Mac's decision to take him on is an honor and a responsibility that Danny attempts to live up to each day.

In "The Party's Over," Danny tells Stella that he comes from a family of cops, though the details of this are left unclear.

In the season 6 premiere, Danny was shown seriously injured after a drive-by shootout that ended the season 5 finale.  He used a wheelchair for the first four episodes of season six, and the implication was that he had used it all summer long.  His wife and fellow CSI, Lindsay Monroe, maintained a steadfast belief that he would teach their daughter to play baseball and dance at her wedding, and was proven at least probably correct.  By the fourth episode, he was taking physical therapy. By the fifth episode, he was walking again, albeit with the aid of a cane.  Later episodes show Danny to be walking normally, though occasionally affected by fatigue and stress.

Outside the lab
It has been implied that Danny is in his mid-30s; Lindsay Monroe made a reference to his 30th birthday in the second season (episode 208, "Bad Beat"). Danny attended college and played minor league baseball until his wrist was broken while playing baseball. He took a ball in the head, and before he had a chance to do the same to the pitcher, the benches were cleared and he got caught up in the pile-up, shattering his wrist and ending any hopes for a career as a baseball player (episode 509, "The Box"). He is also a very good handball player, once using his skills to acquire evidence (episode 216, "Cool Hunter").  He grew up in the same neighborhood as the Tanglewood boys, but maintains he was never a part of the gang like his brother, Louie, was (episode 220, "Run Silent, Run Deep").  Danny is also known to have a fondness for New York style pizza (see "Trapped").

On the job
On the show, Danny has displayed a tendency to follow his intuition when solving a case, rather than relying on the evidence, for which Mac has criticised him (episode 105, "A Man a Mile"). He is also known to be very loyal to his coworkers in the NYPD, often voicing his support even before beginning the investigation.

During the beginning of season 1, Danny is a Detective Third Grade and mainly works in the lab or accompanies Mac or Stella to crime scenes. By the sixth episode, he is given solo control of his first crime scene.  Mac tells Danny and Aiden that the crime scene at a robbery-homicide is theirs and that Danny is the officer in charge.  At the end of the episode, Mac tells Danny that he is on the promotion grid, meaning that his training and experience have prepared him to sit for the next examinations for Detective Second Grade.

He is temporarily removed from the promotion grid (meaning he must wait to be reinstated, and then wait for the next examination schedule) after being accused of shooting an undercover police officer In the subway (episode 121, "On The Job").

Danny is a naturally suspicious person, though he gets along well with the rest of the CSI team.  Detective Don Flack is one of the few people he truly confides in.  He comes to treat Mac as a stand-in father figure at times, accepting feedback and seeking advice over the years.  Danny is somewhat annoyed when he discovers he is the last to learn about the romantic relationship between Mac and Medical Examiner Peyton Driscoll, especially that "even Flack" knew about it before he did (episode 316, "Heart of Glass").

Danny is particularly sensitive when it comes to suspects who act out on the loss of a loved one. In episode 304, "Hung Out To Dry," Danny tells murder suspect Shane Casey that he understands Shane's desire to clear his brother Ian's name, but does not agree with Shane's methods. Danny's words come back to haunt him later when, during the events of "Raising Shane" (episode 311), Shane tries to exploit Danny's sympathy for his situation, as well as Danny's concern for Louie, to get Danny at gunpoint to process the since-abandoned crime scene to obtain evidence that would prove Ian's innocence. To Shane's despair, the CSI brings evidence with him that proves Ian's guilt, and the police take Shane into custody without incident.

Danny takes it upon himself to trade shifts with Lindsay Monroe in episode 324, "Snow Day," taking her place to assist lab tech Adam Ross at a warehouse crime scene. When he arrives, he is taken hostage and held along with Adam by Irish mobsters who hope to use the situation to distract the NYPD while others of their clan break into the lab to retrieve a huge cocaine seizure from earlier in the day. Danny is badly beaten during his captivity (taking a total of 4 blows to the head, one to the spine and having his left hand broken), but with Adam's help, manages to take down their captors in time to be rescued by the officers gathered outside.

In The Party's Over, Danny backs out of a crime scene, claiming to be sick, and goes on a strike of sorts, or blue flu, due to pay issues within the NYPD and the crime lab. When Stella Bonasera arrives at his apartment to confront him, she reluctantly agrees that she sees where he's coming from.  He also earns the ire of Hawkes, who refers to him as "selfish".  At the end of the episode, the two seem to have reconciled.

In mid season 6, Danny gets acupuncture done to his back.  While he was there, his wallet, dog tags, and badge were stolen.  Later on, Danny found his dog tags at a crime scene that he and Flack were working.  On the tags were found the prints of Shane Casey, the escaped serial killer from Season 3, who has a history of targeting those who he sees as working against him.

In the season finale, "Vacation Getaway," Danny, Lindsay, and Lucy go on a vacation. While on vacation, they are unaware that the serial killer, Casey, is following them. The team tries to find them by their cell phone signals, but Danny doesn't have his, and Lindsay turned hers off. Lindsay turns her phone on to take a photo of Danny and Lucy before entering a lighthouse, so the other CSIs are able to locate them. While visiting the lighthouse, they meet Casey. Casey tells Lindsay and Lucy to leave because his fight is "not with them," and they go down to the police. In the end, Casey falls off of the lighthouse. Danny tries to help him and tells him to hold on. Casey lets go after saying, "Don't worry, Messer. I will." In the last moments of the episode, Lucy is crying, so Danny wakes up to go get her while Lindsay remains asleep. When he goes into her room, Casey is seen holding a crying Lucy with a smile on his face. Then the screen goes black and a gunshot is heard, leaving Danny's status a mystery.

In the season 7 premiere, "The 34th Floor", it is shown that Danny is still alive. Lindsay then comes into the room with her gun and orders Casey to drop his, but Casey threatens to kill Lucy if she didn't do as he ordered. Even though Danny told her to do as ordered, Lindsay fires a shot at Casey (the shot heard at the end of season 6), killing him instantly. Danny then runs to get Lucy out of the hands of Casey. Lindsay was then honored for her bravery.

In the season 7 finale, "Exit Strategy", it is revealed that Danny has taken, and passed, the sergeant's exam. At the beginning of season 8 he works as a Patrol Sergeant training rookie officers. By the end of episode 804, "Officer Involved", Danny voluntarily gives up his promotion and returns to the Crime Lab after being framed by one of his trainees in an internal affairs investigation.

Awards and decorations
The following are the medals and service awards worn by then-Sergeant Messer, as seen in "Keep It Real".

Relationships

Some people regard Danny as a playboy, seemingly aware of his good looks and charm. The possibility of having multiple girlfriends is alluded to (Episode 113, Tanglewood) when Aiden assumes Danny has visited a so-called rub-and-tug kind of massage parlor he replies "You kidding me? I got girlfriends for that, why would I pay?" During a case they worked together, Stella catches Danny checking out the waitresses in a trendy Japanese restaurant in which food is served off the bodies of nude serving women (Episode 104, "Grand Master)". When Stella comments about the sanitation of this kind of dining Danny replies, "Who cares if it's sanitary? I wanna see the menu." In season 2 (episode 210, Jamalot), he is seen to be dating a woman named Cindy; in the episode, his phone rings, showing her name while playing a Coldplay song, and Danny states, "It's called "Talk"—something my girlfriend is really good at."

Aiden Burn

In Season 1, Danny and fellow CSI Aiden Burn were shown to have a very close relationship as friends who routinely flirt with one another. In season 1 episode 19, Danny and Aiden work a case during which he catches Aiden behaving flirtatiously towards Officer Lilly, the first officer on the scene, and, back at the lab, teases her about it.  Aiden tells Danny that he's cute, but she's way out of his league, which he takes in good humour. In the late Season 2 episode "Heroes" (episode 223), Aiden, who had been fired from the crime lab earlier in the season, is found brutally murdered. Danny is by far the most shaken member of the team, and lashes out at a man brought in for questioning for Aiden's death. When he begs Mac to let him interrogate the man, Mac refuses, knowing Danny is likely to become violent out of grief. After catching Aiden's killer, a rapist named D.J. Pratt, who Aiden had been intent on bringing to justice, Danny and the rest of the team meet at a local pub and toast their lost friend and colleague while reminiscing about her, knowing that they have fulfilled their promise to put Pratt behind bars for his crimes.

Lindsay Monroe

Danny initially indulges in some friendly team hazing of Lindsay Monroe, the detective brought in from Bozeman, Montana, at Mac's request to fill the gap left by Aiden's dismissal. On her first day, Danny tricks Lindsay into calling Mac "sir," a title that Mac has always hated (episode 203, "Zoo York"). Lindsay resents this incident, and over the course of the next episode, they are both stand-offish in their interactions.  They soon come to respect each other professionally and develop a friendship. For the remainder of Season 2, their relationship is one of friendly competition and playful banter which is obvious even to their coworkers; the coroner Sid Hammerback tells Lindsay that Danny calls her "Montana" because he has a crush on her (Episode 222 "Stealing Home").

In episode 302, "Not What It Looks Like," Danny's deepening feelings towards Lindsay manifest themselves almost by accident.  He voices his concern when Lindsay volunteers to go undercover and walk into a hostage situation, and, when she is rescued by the team, she is the first person he looks for, checking her for injury and holding her close.  In the following episode, "Love Run Cold," he is shown to have asked her on a dinner date, for which she never appeared, offering only an apology afterwards.  Later, she admits that she shares his feelings, but that she needs time alone to put some things behind her that she thought she had dealt with.  Lindsay's withdrawal in this and subsequent episodes is later revealed to be due to renewed grief from having been the sole survivor of an attack, as a teenager, during which several of her friends were murdered by a man named Daniel Katums.

In episode 318, "Sleight Out of Hand," Danny works multiple shifts while Lindsay returned to Bozeman, Montana to testify at Katums murder trial. After Mac sends an exhausted and borderline-delirious Danny home, Danny makes a spur of the moment decision to fly to Bozeman.  He arrives at the courthouse while Lindsay is on the stand. His presence gives her the confidence to finish her testimony, after having broken down on the stand once already. After the trial concludes with the conviction of the murder suspect, they hug and Lindsay reels him in for a kiss but they are mobbed by reporters and miss their chance. They leave the courtroom hand-in-hand.

In the third-season finale episode 324 "Snow Day," Danny and Lindsay sleep together on the billiard table at Danny's after an evening of drinking and playing pool at Danny's apartment.

Danny and Lindsay's romantic relationship is not featured in the early episodes of season 4, although there are several scenes of them bantering, obviously deeply enamoured.  In episode 401 "Can You Hear Me Now?" Lindsay slips a can of condom spray into Danny's shirt pocket while giving him a suggestive look.

Things take a downward turn in Danny's life in episode 411 "Child's Play," when a neighbor's child, Ruben Sandoval, whose care had been entrusted to Danny for the day, is killed by a stray bullet during a bodega robbery.  Danny's grief and guilt plague him over the next several episodes, causing him to withdraw from Lindsay and act to protect the boy's mother, Rikki Sandoval.  In episode 413, "All in the Family," Lindsay covers for Danny when he skips work to search for Rikki, who has stolen Danny's service weapon and gone to hunt down and kill the man she blames for her son's death.  Flack and Danny intervene before she fulfills her plan. While Flack argues that Danny needs to report what happened, Danny is reluctant to cause trouble for Rikki, who is nearly crazed with grief.  At the end of the episode, Rikki chooses to turn herself in to the police. In episode 416, "Right Next Door," Danny and Rikki are shown indulging in an affair.  When Lindsay calls him, Danny blows her off as he is making breakfast for Rikki.  Later on, when Lindsay is standoffish towards him, he thinks that she is still moping over his forgetting her birthday, but she eventually lays her feelings bare, stating that she was in love with him but that she had to figure a way to stop it.

In the next episode (episode 417, "Like Water for Murder"), however, Danny is again flirting with Lindsay in the lab.  He upsets her when he suggests they get together to watch a movie, causing her to leave the lab abruptly.  In episode 419 "Personal Foul," Danny calls Lindsay, admitting that he has missed her and asks her to come see him at his apartment. Not long after, Rikki Sandoval tells Danny that she is moving away, and both acknowledge that their fling had been a mistake.

Anna Belknap's real-life pregnancy inspired the storyline in which Danny learns that Lindsay is pregnant with his child in episode 509, "The Box". .  In "The Box," much of the episode is shown from Danny's point of view and details his reaction to Lindsay's admission of her pregnancy and her remarks that she "knows him" and does not expect anything from him.  Though he is scared of the changes that Lindsay's pregnancy will bring, by the end of the episode, he makes the decision to stand by Lindsay, figuratively (and literally, in context).

In episode 510, "The Triangle," Danny expresses concern over the baby's health and asks Lindsay to marry him.  To his surprise and disappointment, she declines.  Later, after the case has wrapped up, he presses her about her unwillingness to marry him.  She explains that she merely feels that it is the wrong time and that she wants to get married for the right reasons.  Seemingly satisfied with her answer, Danny then tells Lindsay that he loves her, which she reciprocates.  They then go see Mac together to break the news of the pregnancy to him.

Subsequent episodes show Danny eagerly anticipating becoming a father; he puts his hand on Lindsay's belly when she says that their baby kicked (episode 511, "Forbidden Fruit") and he sits at eye level with her belly as he reads from a comic book.  When he is interrupted by the results of his DNA evidence, he kisses Lindsay's stomach and promises the baby that he will be back (episode 516, "No Good Deed").

In episode 517, "Green Piece" Danny expresses concern when Lindsay offers to help at a crime scene. and they talk about her upcoming trip to Montana to see her family.  Later on, Danny talks with Mac about Lindsay.  At the end of the episode, Danny takes Lindsay, who is protesting that she needs to pack for her trip the next day, to city hall.  Under the pretense of meeting some friends, he brings her to the city clerk's office.  He reiterates his feelings for her and asks again Lindsay to marry him.  This time, Lindsay agrees.  The friends turn out to be Mac and Stella, who witness Danny and Lindsay's wedding.  The vows are read as a montage of the couple's history, from their first meeting in Season 2's "Zoo York" to "Forbidden Fruit", is shown.

In "Point of No Return" (episode 518), Danny is forced to kill a crime scene suspect in self-defense.  After he returns to the lab, he begins to understand the gravity of his new life; he looks in the mirror and realizes that he came close to getting killed himself, which would have widowed Lindsay and left their baby without a father.

In the following episode, "Communication Breakdown," Danny spends a great deal of time throughout the episode picking out possible names for the baby, which he assumes will be a boy.  When Stella posits that the baby could be a girl, Danny is skeptical, pointing out that his mother had only boys, and that Lindsay has three brothers.  A text from Lindsay soon after proves Stella right; the baby is a girl.  In "Greater Good" (episode 523), Lindsay, now back from Montana, goes into labor in the lab and has Adam take her to the hospital.  Hawkes rushes Danny to the hospital to join his wife, who gives birth to a baby girl.  Though they disagree initially on the baby's name (Danny wants to name the baby "Lucy," but Lindsay prefers "Lydia"), they do agree that they would like Mac to be the baby's godfather.  Mac accepts.  The following episode, "Grounds For Deception," reveals that Baby Messer's name is Lucy.  Danny and Lindsay bring her to the lab, where their co-workers fuss over her.  Danny becomes protective of Lucy when he sees that one of the co-workers is male and Lindsay says that Lucy "adores him."

In the episode after "Pay Up", "Epilogue", Danny is shot in the gunfire at the bar while protecting Lindsay and is in a wheelchair because he is paralyzed from the waist down. By the end of the episode he moves his foot slightly, showing that he is only temporarily paralyzed. Within a few episodes he is indeed walking again, albeit with the help of a cane. At the end of the episode "Dead Reckoning," the first thing he does onscreen without the wheelchair is to hold his infant daughter in his arms.

In "Vacation Getaway" (episode 623), Danny and Lindsay go to Long Island for a holiday along with Lucy. Whilst there the rest of the team realise that Shane Casey was after Danny after Casey escaped prison in "Redemptio" (episode 619). Casey followed them to Long Island and put the family at gunpoint in a lighthouse. Lindsay escapes with Lucy leaving Danny alone with Casey. The team arrive at the scene before anything happens and Danny manages to fight with Casey who falls into the sea. Danny meets with Lindsay and Lucy and the pair decide to stay at home for the rest of their holiday.

At the end of "Vacation Getaway", it is revealed that Shane Casey didn't die from the fall. Danny hears Lucy crying and goes to check on her, finding her in Shane Casey's arms. Shane Casey is again, aiming a gun at Danny who is unarmed. The screen then turns to black and a shot is fired.

In "The 34th Floor" (episode 701), the scene between Shane and Danny is shown again but continued. With Danny held at gunpoint by Casey, Lindsay hears the confrontation between the pair through the baby monitor and grabs her off-duty gun and threatens Casey. She is forced to lower the gun to protect her daughter but as Casey gets distracted, Lindsay shoots killing Casey and saving the lives of the Messer family.

Family
Danny has a brother, Louie Messer. He is married to fellow CSI Lindsay Monroe and they later have a daughter, Lucy Messer. It is revealed in season 9 that Lindsay is pregnant with their second child, a boy.

It is implied in later seasons that he came from a family of cops.

He has an uncle who manufacturers awnings in Queens, as mentioned to Sheldon Hawkes in season 1, episode 17, The Fall.
  

CSI: NY characters
Fictional forensic scientists
Fictional Italian American people
Fictional New York City Police Department detectives
Television characters introduced in 2004

it:Danny Messer